Arcicella rigui  is a Gram-negative, strictly aerobic, vibrioid, polymorphic and non-motile bacterium from the genus of Arcicella which has been isolated from water from the Niao-Song Wetland Park in Taiwan.

References

External links
Type strain of Arcicella rigui at BacDive -  the Bacterial Diversity Metadatabase

Cytophagia
Bacteria described in 2013